Robert E. Whaley is Valere Blair Potter Professor of Management and Director of the Financial Markets Research Center at the Owen Graduate School of Management at Vanderbilt University. Whaley developed the Market Volatility Index (VIX) for the Chicago Board Options Exchange in 1993.

He graduated with a Bachelor of Commerce degree from the University of Alberta in 1975, and an MBA (1976) and PhD (1978) from the University of Toronto. He previously taught at Duke University, the University of Chicago, and the University of Alberta.

References

Year of birth missing (living people)
Living people
University of Alberta alumni
University of Toronto alumni
Vanderbilt University faculty
Duke University faculty
University of Chicago faculty
Academic staff of the University of Alberta